"Honest" is a song by American hip hop recording artist Future. It was released on August 19, 2013, as the second single from his second studio album of the same name. The song has peaked at number 55 on the Billboard Hot 100. The song addressed Future had an accusation of his net worth and child support and lied to his mother.

Music video
On September 11, 2013, the music video directed by Colin Tilley was released.

Charts

Weekly charts

Year-end charts

Certifications

Release history

References

2013 singles
2013 songs
Epic Records singles
Future (rapper) songs
Music videos directed by Colin Tilley
Songs written by Future (rapper)
Songs written by Metro Boomin
Song recordings produced by Metro Boomin
Songs written by DJ Spinz